Solar–hydrogen energy cycle is an energy cycle where a solar powered electrolyzer is used to convert water to hydrogen and oxygen. Hydrogen and oxygen produced thus are stored to be used by a fuel cell to produce electricity when no sunlight is available.

Working
Photovoltaic panels convert sunlight to electricity. In this cycle, the excess electricity produced after consumption by devices connected to the system, is used to power an electrolyzer. The electrolyzer converts water into hydrogen and oxygen, which is stored. This hydrogen is used up by a fuel cell to produce electricity, which can power the devices when sunlight is unavailable.

Features
The Solar–Hydrogen energy cycle can be incorporated using organic thin film solar cells and microcrystalline silicon thin film solar cells This cycle can also be incorporated using photoelectrochemical solar cells. These solar have been incorporated since 1972 for hydrogen production and is capable of directly converting sunlight into chemical energy.

Use of hydrogen iodide
An aqueous solution of hydrogen iodide has been proposed as an alternative to water as a fuel that can be used in this cycle. Splitting of hydrogen iodide is easier than splitting water as its Gibbs energy change for decomposition is lesser. Hence silicon photoelectrodes can decompose hydrogen iodide into hydrogen and iodine without any external bias.

Advantages
 This cycle is pollution free as the only effluent from this cycle is pure water.

See also
Energy storage
Photoelectrolysis of water
Photocatalytic water splitting
Power to gas

References

Thermodynamic cycles
Hydrogen production